Self-Portrait in a Black Eyepatch is an oil on canvas painting by the Belgian artist Rik Wouters, probably painted in 1915. It is now in the Royal Museum of Fine Arts, Antwerp.

References

1915 paintings
20th-century portraits
Self-portraits
Portraits of men
Paintings in the collection of the Royal Museum of Fine Arts Antwerp
Belgian paintings